George Holloway (26 April 1884 – 22 September 1966) was an English cricketer. He played for Gloucestershire between 1908 and 1911.

References

1884 births
1966 deaths
English cricketers
Gloucestershire cricketers
Cricketers from Stroud